The 2019–20 season was a FC Ararat-Armenia's 2nd season in Armenian Premier League, of which they were defending champions. 
Ararat-Armenia finished the season as Armenian Premier League Champions for the second year in a row and were Runners-up to FC Noah in the Armenian Cup. In Europe, AIK knocked them out of the UEFA Champions League in the first qualifying round, resulting in Ararat-Armenia dropping into the UEFA Europa League, where they reached the playoff round before defeat to Dudelange.

Season events
On 18 June, Ararat-Armenia were drawn against Allsvenskan Champions AIK in the first qualifying round of the UEFA Champions League. The following day, 19 June, Ararat-Armenia announced the signing of Ângelo Meneses. On 20 June, Sergi left Ararat-Armenia after his contract expired, whilst Aleksey Pustozyorov and Giovanny Martínez left the club after their contracts where ended by mutual consent. On 24 June, Ararat-Armenia announced their second signing of the summer, with Ilja Antonov joining from Hermannstadt, with Rochdi Achenteh signing the following day, and Furdjel Narsingh signed on 26 June. Zakaria Sanogo signed for Ararat-Armenia on 5 July, with Ararat-Armenia winning their first ever European match on 9 July, a 2–1 victory over AIK at home with Petros Avetisyan scoring both goals. On 13 July, David Davidyan left Ararat-Armenia by mutual consent,  whilst Ararat-Armenia traveled to Stockholm to face AIK at the Friends Arena on 17 July, losing 3–1 on the night and 4–3 on aggregate, dropping them into the UEFA Europa League qualifying stages.
After dropping into the UEFA Europa League Second qualifying round, Ararat-Armenia were drawn against Lincoln Red Imps of the Gibraltar National League. The first leg took place at the Republican Stadium in Yerevan on 23 July, finishing 2–0 to Ararat-Armenia after goals from Anton Kobyalko and Kódjo. The return leg took place on 30 July at the Victoria Stadium in Gibraltar, with Ararat-Armenia running out 2-1 winners, 4–1 on aggregate, with both goals coming from Ogana Louis.

On 31 December, Ararat-Armenia announced the signing of Marcos Pizzelli, however on 11 January, Ararat-Armenia and Pizzelli announced that he was retiring for football due to injury. On 12 January, Petros Avetisyan moved to FC Tobol.

On 1 February, Ararat-Armenia announced the signing of Yoan Gouffran.

On 12 March 2020, the Football Federation of Armenia announced that all Armenian Premier League games had been postponed until 23 March, and that the Armenian Cup Semifinal second legs had also been postponed due to the COVID-19 pandemic.

Squad

Out on loan

Transfers

In

Out

Loans out

Released

Friendlies

Competitions

Overall record

Armenian Supercup

Premier League

Regular season

Results summary

Results

Table

Championship round

Results summary

Results

Table

Armenian Cup

Final

UEFA Champions League

Qualifying rounds

UEFA Europa League

Qualifying rounds

Statistics

Appearances and goals

|-
|colspan="16"|Players away on loan:
|-
|colspan="16"|Players who left Ararat-Armenia during the season:

|}

Goal scorers

Clean sheets

Disciplinary Record

References

FC Ararat-Armenia seasons
Ararat-Armenia
Ararat-Armenia
Ararat-Armenia